Poropuntius genyognathus is a species of ray-finned fish in the genus Poropuntius from the lower Salween and Tenasserim river drainages in southeastern Myanmar and from Peninsular Thailand.

References 

genyognathus
Fish described in 1998